Badis Lebbihi (born 14 March 1990) is a French-Algerian footballer who plays as a defender.

Career 
Born in Nanterre, Lebbihi began his career with RC Paris and joined than to INF Clairefontaine. After two years with INF Clairefontaine signed a youth contract with Lille OSC in 2006 and played his debut in the Ligue 1 on 24 November 2007 against AS Nancy.

On 19 June 2009, Lebbihi left Lille OSC to sign a three-year deal with SV Zulte-Waregem.

International career 
Lebbihi has already represented France at the U-17 and U-18 level. According to Algerian newspaper El Khabar, Lebbihi will join the Algerian U-20 team in a set of friendlies against Tunisia in March 2009.

References

External links
 RLFoot Profile
 Footgoal Profile

1990 births
Living people
People from Nanterre
French sportspeople of Algerian descent
Algerian footballers
French footballers
Association football defenders
INF Clairefontaine players
Lille OSC players
S.V. Zulte Waregem players
Dijon FCO players
SAS Épinal players
Kaposvári Rákóczi FC players
Ligue 1 players
Belgian Pro League players
Nemzeti Bajnokság I players
French expatriate footballers
Expatriate footballers in Belgium
Expatriate footballers in Hungary
French expatriate sportspeople in Belgium
French expatriate sportspeople in Hungary
Footballers from Hauts-de-Seine